Maloye Yuryevo is a rural locality (a village) in Kovarditskoye Rural Settlement, Muromsky District, Vladimir Oblast, Russia. The population was 16 as of 2010.

Geography 
Maloye Yuryevo is located on the Kartyn River, 16 km west of Murom (the district's administrative centre) by road. Okheyevo is the nearest rural locality.

References 

Rural localities in Muromsky District
Muromsky Uyezd